The M250 consists of two six-barrel 66-millimeter grenade launchers (the British  No. 19 Mk 2 design) used on the M1 Abrams tank. The M250 is designed to fire M82 smoke grenades.

References

Grenade launchers of the United States